Zinc finger protein 784 is a protein that in humans is encoded by the ZNF784 gene.

References

Further reading 

Human proteins